Robin is a fictional character in publications from DC Comics. Robin has long been a fixture in the Batman comic books as Batman's sidekick. Since 1940, several different youths have appeared as Robin. In each incarnation, Robin's brightly colored visual appearance and youthful energy have served as a contrast to Batman's dark look and manner.

This page is a list of the alternative versions of Robin in comic books, including DC Comics, the multiverse, Elseworlds, and other sources.

In mainstream comics continuity
 Dick Grayson is the original Robin. Though he later assumes the name Nightwing in the comics, Grayson is the most commonly portrayed version in other media. Grayson was temporarily Batman, but with Bruce Wayne's return, he went back to being Nightwing. Following the events of Forever Evil, he became an agent of Spyral under the alias Agent 37. In DC Rebirth, he reclaims the mantle of Nightwing and is part of the Titans team.
 Jason Todd becomes Robin after Grayson, though his super heroic career is ended by his untimely death at the hands of The Joker. Todd is later resurrected and assumes the Joker's former identity, the Red Hood. He briefly tried to take over the mantle of Batman, before Dick Grayson made him fall to his apparent death; he is now the Red Hood again traveling with Roy Harper a.k.a. Arsenal, and Starfire the alien princess before disbanding the Outlaws group. Before the events of DC Rebirth, he worked alongside Roy Harper in the "Red Hood and Arsenal" series. He forms the Outlaws once again in DC Rebirth, this time with Bizarro and Artemis.
 Tim Drake assumes the Robin identity after Todd and becomes the third Robin, but quits at the request of his father. After his replacement Stephanie Brown is presumed dead, Drake reclaims the mantle. Batman (Dick Grayson) passes the Robin mantle on to Damian Wayne after the events of Battle for the Cowl.  Drake, reluctantly, becomes Red Robin. In the New 52, he was part of the Teen Titans. In DC Rebirth, Drake worked alongside Spoiler, Orphan, and Clayface as part of a boot camp led by Batman and Batwoman, until he was presumed KIA from an attack by a swarm of drones. Instead, he was teleported away and captured by an unknown force at the last second.
 Bruce Wayne briefly assumed the role when de-aged during the Sins of Youth storyline.
 Stephanie Brown, Tim Drake's ex-girlfriend who was a superheroine known as the Spoiler, briefly takes on the Robin name in place of Drake, becoming the first female version of the superhero and the fourth Robin before her death due to Black Mask. She also serves as the third Batgirl before The New 52 reboot restored the title to Barbara Gordon. She is currently in a boot camp led by Batman and Batwoman.
 Damian Wayne, the son of Bruce Wayne and Talia al Ghul and the current Robin, assumed the Robin mantle after the events of Battle for the Cowl. He currently leads the Teen Titans in DC Rebirth.

Pre-Crisis on Infinite Earths, a number of Robins lived on different "Earths" in the original multiverse (which was destroyed during Crisis).

In a Batman story from the 1950s, Bruce Wayne assumes the identity of Robin. Richard Grayson of Earth-Two carried on his Robin mantle long into adulthood. Post-52, an entirely new finite multiverse was discovered and created, and as such, a number of Robins may exist now on other alternative Earths. In one frame of the final issue of 52, a new Earth-2 is depicted, along with a character that resembles the original, adult Earth-2 Robin. Whether it is that character or not remains to be seen, as this Earth-2 is not identical to the one that existed before Crisis on Infinite Earths.  In another case, Talon is an analogue of Robin, from the new Earth-3 where his relationship with Owlman mirrors that of Batman and Robin in the mainstream universes and maintained a romantic relationship with Duela Dent. Batman #666 depicts a future in which Batman's biological son Damian Wayne becomes Batman, having previously served as Robin.

Alternative versions

Batman Beyond
In the DC Rebirth run, Matt McGinnis, brother of Terry McGinnis, becomes the newest incarnation of Robin in order to save his brother from the villain Payback. Initially excited about the role, Matt was eventually asked to stop being Robin after his encounter with the Joker.

Batman: Digital Justice
In the digitally rendered tale Batman: Digital Justice, James Gordon the grandson of his namesake, Commissioner Gordon, takes on the mantle of the Batman. A character named Robert Chang, who is somewhat reminiscent of the post-Crisis Jason Todd, takes on the mantle of Robin.

Batman '89: Drake Winston
In 2021, DC published Batman '89, a limited series that served as a continuation of Tim Burton's Batman films Batman and Batman Returns, ignoring the subsequent films Batman Forever (1995) and Batman & Robin (1997), in which actor Michael Keaton did not appear following Burton's departure from the franchise. This series featured a new version of Robin named Drake Winston (whose appearance is inspired by Marlon Wayans, who was originally attached to play the role in the Burton films).

Winston is a mechanic who works at Royal Autobody, an auto shop in Burnside owned by Harvey Dent's childhood mentor, Jerome Otis. His ancestors had their own automotive company that was acquired by Bruce Wayne's great-grandfather in a forced buyout. He strongly dislikes cops and authority figures and dresses up as a masked vigilante at night to help the residents of his neighborhood. He is initially distrustful of both Bruce Wayne and Batman, but after witnessing his dedication towards helping people and figuring out they are the same person, the two become partners and work together to stop the corrupted Dent and arsonists terrorizing the city.

Winston never directly calls himself "Robin" in the story, but there are several allusions to his alias. He likes birds and keeps several as pets, including a robin. When he stops a group of Batman impersonators from breaking into a store, some bystanders thought he was called Robin because one of the impersonators claimed he was "robbin' the store". When Bruce asks him what he calls himself at the end of the story, he considers naming himself "The Avenging Eagle" since he likes birds, but says it's not final and he's still deciding.

Dick Grayson (Earth Two)

The Robin of Earth-Two is a parallel version of the fictional DC Comics superhero, who was introduced after DC Comics created Earth-Two, a parallel world that was retroactively established as the home of characters which had been published in the Golden Age of comic books.  This allowed creators to publish comic books featuring Robin while being able to disregard Golden Age stories, solving an incongruity, as Robin had been published as a single ongoing incarnation since inception.

Robin's origin and history begins the same as the classic version except the timeframe occurs when the Detective Comics #38 was originally printed: 1940.
 Richard Grayson's parents are killed by Anthony Zucco.
 After a period of training, a young Dick Grayson becomes Robin.  His first printed story is "Robin, the Boy Wonder."
 Robin participates in the war-time only All Star Squadron.  His distant cousin is Charles Grayson, the scientific assistant of Robotman.

This version of Dick Grayson ceased to exist after the multi arc DC Universe spanning event Crisis on Infinite Earths. He was killed by the Anti-Monitor's Shadow Demons while trying to save civilians, along with Earth-1's Kole and the daughter of Earth-Two's Batman, the Huntress (Helena Wayne).

When the Multiverse was recreated in the DC Universe event, Infinite Crisis, a new Earth-Two was born, with a Dick Grayson that resembles the original Earth-Two Grayson. It was established that this new Earth-Two was not the same one as before the Crisis on the Infinite Earths, although Grayson's attitude and his status as a crime-fighter with the Justice Society certainly reflected what had gone before.

After the events of Flashpoint, Helena Wayne, daughter of Earth-2's Batman and Catwoman served as Robin and became the only partner that Batman had ever had. In this continuity, Bruce Wayne had never adopted Dick Grayson as his ward, so he never became Robin on Earth-2. However, he does appear later, married to Earth-2's Barbara Gordon, who never became Batgirl on Earth-2.

Talon (Earth-3)

The second Talon is a fictional character shown in Teen Titans #38 (2006), the former sidekick of Owlman, created by Geoff Johns and Tony S. Daniel. He is a former member of the Crime Society and a member of the Teen Titans during the one-year gap after Infinite Crisis. According to an interview with Tony Daniel at Newsarama, Talon is supposed to look like his mentor Owlman. He briefly battled Black Adam with his fellow Titans during World War III. It was revealed in The Search for Ray Palmer: Crime Society that there have been several Talons. The first one is shown dressed parallel to that of Grayson's classic Robin costume, including brown pixie boots. On post-Crisis Earth-3, the Teen Titans' Talon and Duela Dent, the daughter of the Jokester, had been dating. When Duela revealed their relationship to her parents, her father denounced her and the two fled. It is unknown how the two managed to flee to New Earth, or what has happened to Talon beyond that.

Bruce Wayne Junior
In "The Second Batman and Robin Team" (Batman #131, April 1960), Bruce Wayne's butler Alfred writes a story about the possible future of Batman and Robin. In it, Bruce Wayne marries Kathy Kane (Batwoman) and they have a son named Bruce Jr. When Wayne retires as Batman, Dick Grayson takes over the role of the Caped Crusader. Bruce Jr., having secretly trained on his own, volunteers to become the new Robin, despite objections from his mother. As Robin II, he fights alongside Batman II. Several subsequent "imaginary stories" featuring Bruce Jr. followed; the last in this series was "Bat-Girl--Batwoman II" in Batman #163 (May 1964). Bruce Wayne Jr next appeared in World's Finest Comics #215 (January 1973) as one of the Super-Sons.

Grant Morrison used the Bruce Wayne Jr. character in JLA #9 (September 1997), in the story "Elseworlds." After the supervillain Key traps the Justice Leaguers in dream worlds, Batman dreams of a future in which he is married to Selina Kyle/Catwoman.  They have a son named Bruce Junior, who was raised from birth to be a superhero and serves as Robin II alongside a Tim Drake Batman.

John Byrne created his own Bruce Jr. in the epilogue of the Batman/Captain America crossover from 1996; this Robin is a red-head and resembles a male Carrie Kelley. Captain America wakes up in modern times after having been frozen in ice towards the end of World War II. He reunites with Batman, a friend who had helped him when Joker and Red Skull joined forces. Cap is amazed to learn that in the time he slept, Bruce Wayne has retired from being Batman, has passed the mantle to Dick Grayson and that his son Bruce Junior is the new Robin.

Byrne revisited Bruce Jr. in his Superman & Batman: Generations series. There, Bruce Junior is son of Bruce Senior and his wife, who is never identified but is implied to be Julie Madison.  "BJ" greatly desires to be a hero and trains in the hopes of following in his father's footsteps.  His mother refuses to let BJ become Robin until he turns eighteen.  On Halloween night of 1964, when BJ is fifteen, he and Superman's daughter Kara (Supergirl) sneak out to have an adventure and, with the help of Wonder Woman's daughter Wonder Girl and The Flash's nephew Kid Flash join forces to defeat some of Flash's Rogue's Gallery.  Afterward they decide to form their own team called the Justice League.  BJ and Kara become romantically involved as adults, but BJ puts the relationship on hold when Joker kills Dick, forcing him to become the third Batman.  BJ and Kara eventually marry, but their wedding is halted by Kara's brother Joel Kent.  Joel, who had been manipulated his whole life by Lex Luthor to hate his family, kills Kara by punching through her chest.  Joel dies shortly thereafter, and BJ agrees to raise his powerless son in order to prevent another such tragedy from happening (he also marries Joel's widow, Mei-Lai, sometime in the intervening years).  The child, named Clark Wayne, becomes BJ's Robin and is offered the mantle of Batman when he becomes an adult.  Clark turns it down, having deduced that he isn't BJ's biological son, and believing that only a real Wayne should be Batman, instead adopts the identity of Knightwing.  In the 1990s, BJ goes on a quest to locate his missing father, whom he eventually discovers as having taken over Ra's al Ghul's criminal empire and turned it into a force for good.  Bruce asks BJ to assume control of the organization so that he can become Batman once again.  A story in Generations II has Bruce's dying wife imply that BJ isn't his biological son, but this is not explored until Generations III, where BJ uses a Lazarus Pit and becomes Robin once more, ultimately learning that he truly is Bruce's son and everything was a plan by his mother to make up for never allowing father and son to work together as heroes.  In Generations III, BJ's life is greatly extended by the use of the Lazarus Pit so he can help the human resistance battle the forces of Darkseid, but when he is mortally wounded he decides to pass on, feeling that he's kept Kara waiting far too long; the sight of their spirits departing together is enough to make even Bruce Senior shed a tear.

For more information on a similar concept, see Damian Wayne, Bruce Wayne's son by Talia al Ghul. In the wake of his father's apparent death, his father's first Robin, Dick Grayson, took over as Batman with Damian serving as the new Robin. The version of Damian depicted in Batman: The Brave and the Bold has more in common with Bruce Jr. than with his portrayal in comics.

Deathwing
Introduced as an alternative Dick Grayson in the pages of Team Titans from a timeline when his Titan teammate Donna Troy had a son who was driven mad, took on the mantle of Lord Chaos and conquered his world. This version of Dick stayed in his identity of Nightwing and helped train squadrons of superpowered teenagers that became known as the Teen Titans. He was involved with the much younger Titan Mirage during this time. This alternative-future Nightwing came back in time and briefly joins the Team Titans when their mission takes them to their past, our present. This version of Nightwing, attacked and corrupted by a dark version of Raven shortly after his arrival, changes his name to "Deathwing", and serves as her assistant. He becomes so twistedly evil that he at one point tracks down his one-time lover, Mirage, and rapes her. She becomes pregnant and has a child named Julienne.

During the Zero Hour event that retroactively erased this timeline, Mirage, Terra and Deathwing survive. It is later established that they are from the current timeline, and were shunted through time and given false memories by the Time Trapper, who wished to use them as sleeper agents against the time travel villain Extant.

It wasn't revealed until one of the later runs of the Teen Titans that this was not Dick Grayson, in fact his true identity was never uncovered. After this storyline, this version of Nightwing has not been seen since.

Red Robin

In Kingdom Come (a post-Infinite Crisis Earth-22), a middle-aged Dick Grayson reclaims the Robin mantle and becomes Red Robin, not at the side of his former mentor Batman, but rather with Superman's League. His uniform is closer to Batman's in design, rather than any previous Robin uniform. Age has not slowed him down, as he possesses all of his stealth and fighting skills. In this story he has a daughter with Starfire; Mar'i Grayson (Nightstar). Starfire has apparently died by the time of the story, according to the Elliot S! Maggin novelization, and Nightstar calls Bruce Wayne "Grandpa", despite no blood relation. At the end of the comic and the novel, Bruce and Dick reconcile.

Red Robin reappeared in promotional material for the DC Countdown event. Eventually, it was revealed that this Red Robin was not Dick Grayson, but rather Jason Todd who appeared under the cape and cowl.  The Red Robin costume was stated to be more symbolism, than an actual costume choice, as Jason has been both the Red Hood and Robin, being shown as Red Robin.

However, in Countdown to Final Crisis #17, Jason dons a Red Robin suit from a display case in the "Bat Bunker" (Earth-51's equivalent to the Bat Cave) as he and Earth-51 Batman join the fight raging on the Earth above the bunker. Jason keeps his new suit and identity for the rest of his tenure as a "Challenger of the Unknown", only to discard it on his return to New Earth and revert to his "Red Hood" street clothing.

During the Scattered Pieces tie-in to Batman R.I.P., a new Red Robin makes his appearance, at first only as a glimmering image following Robin (Tim Drake) and suspected to have stolen a briefcase of money from the Penguin.  Tim initially suspects Jason Todd of reprising his Red Robin persona. Jason claims innocence, supposing that someone may have stolen his suit when he discarded it earlier.  The new Red Robin breaks up a scuffle between Tim and Jason, and later is revealed to be Ulysses Armstrong.  Armstrong later changes costumes when he reveals himself to be the new Anarky, and after being severely burned in an explosion, an embattled Tim Drake dons the less-revealing Red Robin costume to hide his wounds.  He later returns to his standard uniform.

In 2009, a new on-going series was introduced titled Red Robin.  The new Red Robin was revealed to be Tim Drake.

In 2014-5's Multiversity series, a Red Robin also appears as part of Superman's darker incarnation of the Justice League on Earth-22, still based on the alternate future continuity of Kingdom Come.

Earth-6: Stan Lee's Robin
A version of Robin exists for Stan Lee's Just Imagine... line of comics, in which DC Comics characters were re-imagined by Marvel Comics luminary Stan Lee. Robin is an orphan who has been forced by Reverend Darkk, the series' main villain, into becoming a thief and a murderer. He meets Batman when Darkk assigns Robin to kill him. Batman survives the attack and in return shows Robin what kind of a man Darkk really is. Robin joins the good side for a time, but in the crisis issue it is revealed that Robin has in fact been working with Darkk the whole time; in the end he is transformed into a "Hawk Man", before being reborn through Yggdrasil as the "Atom". In the current New 52 DC Multiverse, these events took place on Earth-6.

DC One Million
In the 853rd Century, the current Batman is aided by the robot called Robin the Toy Wonder. This Batman's parents were guards on the prison planet of Pluto and died in a prison riot that turned into a mass slaughter of the guards. Robin is programmed with the personality of this Batman as a boy and acts as a foil/source of perspective so that he will not become consumed by darkness in his quest for justice. This Robin believes this was the same reason Bruce Wayne brought Dick Grayson into his life.

Earth-31: Robin Redblade
On this alternate Earth, accelerated climate change has resulted in rapid sea level rise, transforming Earth-31 into a devastated waterworld. On the craft Flying Fox, Robin Redblade is one of the crew, and the vessel is piloted by Captain Leatherwing (Batman of Earth-31). Earth-31 also seems to have its own Teen Titans, and Robin Redblade is a member.

Dick Grayson (Earth-43)
In this universe, the setting of Batman & Dracula: Red Rain and its sequels, the Flying Graysons are killed by the vampire Batman, as shown in DC Infinite Halloween Special. Dick grows up to become an obsessive vampire hunter, but is turned by Batman in The Search for Ray Palmer: Red Rain, and becomes his partner. Robin has remained a vampire and is now a member of the "Blood League", a vampire Justice League, alongside Earth-43's Vampire Batman.

Dick Grayson (Earth-50)
In the Wildstorm Universe, Dick Grayson is a Planetary agent in Gotham City, partnered with a man named Jasper who resembles the Joker. He appears in Planetary/Batman: Night on Earth, prior to the Planetary team's shift into universes with a Batman. However, given the events of Flashpoint, this alternate Earth was merged with Earth-0 and Earth-13 and therefore this character no longer exists in main DC continuity.

The Dark Knight Universe Robins
These stories are set in Frank Miller's Dark Knight Universe, which is not considered in continuity with the monthly titles. Miller has stated that the Dark Knight Universe consists of Batman: Year One, All Star Batman and Robin, the Spawn/Batman crossover, The Dark Knight Returns, The Dark Knight Strikes Again and the cancelled Holy Terror, Batman! In this version, Batman looks upon his sidekicks as employees rather than proteges (although he refers to Robin as a protégé in All Star Batman and Robin #9), whom he threatens to "fire" from their "jobs", which he even does to Dick Grayson.

Dick Grayson

In Frank Miller's Dark Knight Universe, Grayson's origin differs in various ways to the official DC Comics Universe. As seen in the All Star Batman and Robin title, he is a twelve-year-old boy who performs in the circus with his two parents, as the Flying Graysons.  Bruce Wayne had come to the show many times to watch him perform his stunts.  One night, while Wayne watches the show with reporter Vicki Vale, the Graysons perform an amazing feat.  The audience begin to cheer and clap when suddenly a man arrives and shoots Grayson's parents in the head.

Batman takes out the gunman while some corrupt Gotham City Police officers take Dick Grayson into custody. They take him instead to a place outside Gotham City, into a deserted stretch of forest where they torture and/or execute people, but Batman comes to the rescue. Batman takes Dick into the Batmobile and asks him to join him in his crusade against crime in Gotham City.  Dick agrees to join the crusade. Upon arrival in the Batcave, Batman intends for Dick to survive in the cave without any help. However Alfred Pennyworth takes pity on Dick and gives him a meal and a decent place to sleep. Batman is displeased, as he wants Dick to go through the same things he did, whether Dick likes it or not.

Later, Batman brings in the killer of Dick's parents, a man called Jocko-boy Vanzetti. Batman tells him that even though Vanzetti killed his parents, someone else hired him to do so. Batman gives Grayson, who at the time had an axe, the choice of whether to kill Jocko-boy or not. Grayson cuts the tape over Vanzetti's mouth and asks him who hired him to kill his parents. The answer, much to Batman's disgust, is the Joker. Batman orders Grayson to make himself a costume. He does so using Robin Hood as an inspiration. He becomes an archer and wears a cape with a hood thus calling himself Hood. Batman, upon seeing this, pulls his hood down, telling him that anyone could do simply that. Batman tells him to lose the hood and calls him Robin. With his new alter-ego confirmed, he accompanies Batman to confront Green Lantern, as Batman and Green Lantern talk in one of Batman's safe houses which Robin had painted yellow in order to keep Hal Jordan from using his power ring. After a lengthy discussion in which Jordan loses his composure and strikes Batman, Jordan accuses Batman of kidnapping Grayson and dressing him up as his sidekick. Batman tells Jordan that Robin is not Grayson, but in fact a boy he met six years ago on a trip to Istanbul. He eventually retracts the lie and merely assures Jordan that Grayson is not Robin. Robin then reveals he took Jordan's power ring and after a short fight, Robin accidentally hits Jordan in the throat, cutting his air supply. Batman then hits Grayson to make him 'stay down', unmasks and performs a tracheotomy to save Jordan's life. After this, Batman reflects on the event, saying that he did not do a very good job of teaching Robin and then takes Robin to his parents' grave to grieve, claiming that is where it started. Dick cries and punches the headstone, after which Batman consoles his grieving and mournful young ward.

Sometime later, Batman fires Grayson for proving unsatisfactory, which strengthens the rift between the two, and they eventually part ways. In The Dark Knight Returns, Grayson is absent but mentioned several times. First, Commissioner Gordon asks Bruce if he has spoken with him recently, and Bruce coldly says he has not. Later, when Batman's new Robin, Carrie Kelley, rescues Batman and asks about his tank-like vehicle, Batman responds that "Dick called it the Batmobile", and later when Batman suffers a diabetic stroke, he desperately calls out Grayson's name. He is also shown talking to Grayson in his mind, such as when he calls the Mutant leader a "brand of evil we had never dreamed of." This seems to imply a sense of fatherly love otherwise not shown, or that Batman simply missed Grayson's company.

In The Dark Knight Strikes Again, Grayson re-appears as a genetically altered supervillain. Sometime after his dismissal, he apparently joined forces with senior villains such as Luthor, and underwent extensive gene manipulation to gain a healing factor and shapeshifting powers, but at the cost of his sanity. At the behest of the government, Grayson begins a maniacal crusade to hunt down and kill as many superheroes as possible, but in order to conceal his identity and partly due to a twisted revenge scheme on Batman, Grayson takes on the appearance of the Joker, who killed himself in The Dark Knight Returns.

After maiming and killing a number of heroes, such as Guardian, the Creeper and the Martian Manhunter, he seeks out Carrie Kelley, Batman's new partner, a.k.a. Catgirl, intending to kill her in order to exact his final revenge on Batman. Grayson confronts Carrie and Green Arrow in the sewers and engages them in battle. Carrie strikes him with thermite, acid and all sorts of chemicals that cause Grayson to explode, apparently killing him, but Saturn Girl later has a vision of a second encounter between Carrie and Grayson and reveals to Carrie that Grayson (though his identity is not yet revealed at this point) is still alive. Grayson eventually ambushes Carrie in the Batcave and proceeds to beat her brutally, lacerating her lips and breaking her bones one by one.  Batman arrives and recognises Grayson when he activates the Batcave's self-destruct and Grayson attempts to shut it down with his old abort code, prompting him to revert to his original form and costume. As Elongated Man takes Carrie to safety, Batman and Grayson contemptuously go over their bleak history together, with Grayson even admitting that despite his harsh treatment, he loved Batman like a father. The two eventually fight, but Grayson remains unharmed by everything Batman throws at him: when Batman beheads him with a Thanagarian axe, Grayson effortlessly catches his head and places it back on his neck. Eventually, Batman hurls himself and Grayson into a pit of lava beneath the Batcave; Grayson falls into the lava and is totally disintegrated, thereby leaving nothing left of Grayson for him to grow back, while Batman is rescued by Superman. As Grayson's remains disappear, Batman acknowledges his ward's demise with a sad "So long, Boy Wonder".

Jason Todd
In Batman: The Dark Knight Returns, Jason Todd is referred to have died in the line of duty, although the exact details are not given.  It is revealed in the prestige format one-shot Dark Knight Returns: The Last Crusade, co-written by Miller and Brian Azzarello, release on June 15, 2016. It is revealed that after Jason defeats and captures the Joker; the villain becomes fixated on him.  After the Joker escaped, Jason tracks his whereabouts on his own, and is brutally beaten to death by the Joker's men.

Carrie Kelley

Trinity
In the Trinity series, reality is altered, removing Superman, Batman and Wonder Woman from the timeline. In this alternative world, "Richie" Grayson is a member of the Zucco mob.

Elseworlds

Alfred is a familiar character in the Batman books as Bruce Wayne's elderly butler. However, in Batman: Dark Allegiances, set in the World War II era, Batman, Catwoman, and Alfred were recruited to fight behind enemy lines in Nazi Germany in the winter of 1940. Alfred is given the codename Robin.

In Superman & Batman: Generations, Dick Grayson is Robin until he goes to college. The role is then taken up by Batman's son, Bruce Wayne Junior, against his mother's wishes. However, he gives up the role when Dick is murdered, in order to become Batman. Several years later, Clark Wayne, the biological son of Joel Kent and adopted son of Bruce Wayne Jr., takes on the role of Robin, before becoming Knightwing.

Set in the 1960s, Batman: Thrillkiller was written and drawn by Howard Chaykin and Dan Brereton and published in 1997-98. It has Bruce Wayne as a detective in the Gotham Police after his family was ruined by the Great Depression. Wayne Manor has been taken over by the rebellious and somewhat unhinged Barbara Gordon, daughter of police Commissioner James Gordon. Her live-in boyfriend is Richart Graustark, who goes under the name of "Dick Grayson", presumably to cover his German origins (World War II being still fresh in people's minds at the time). Barbara and Graustark fight crime as Batgirl and Robin, though, in true 1960s anti-establishment style, their main targets are corrupt cops, in particular those led by the Two-Face-like Detective Duell and the Joker-like but very feminine Bianca Steeplechase. In this version, Grayson's family are still circus acrobats, but their deaths are caused as a result of his activities as Robin rather than the traditional other way round. He is overcome by grief and rage over their murder and his subsequent recklessness leads to his own death. He is replaced as Barbara's partner by Wayne, who takes the identity of Batman, but the memory of him drives Barbara, wracked with guilt over an affair with Wayne and her failure to prevent Grayson's death, to the point of insanity. Becoming increasingly more violent and unstable, she adopts the Robin persona as part of seeking revenge against Steeplechase, who she later drowns. Within the New 52 DC Multiverse, Earth-37's 1960s seem comparable to those of Thrillkiller, although while it has a Batgirl, Robin and female Joker, it now seems to lack a Batman.

The main character in JLA: The Riddle of the Beast, young Robin Drake brings together all the heroes of The World to battle the Beast (Etrigan).

In the French Revolution set Batman: Reign of Terror, Bruce Wayne's sister learns his secret identity, and designs a Robin outfit to aid him.

Batman: Dark Knight Dynasty features three generations of Waynes, past, present and future. In the future section, Brenna Wayne is aided by an ape with augmented intelligence in a Robin costume, who goes by the name 'Rodney'.

In the American Civil War set The Blue, The Gray and the Bat, Captain Bruce Wayne is aided by a Native American named Redbird. Redbird's family were killed by white men, and, until he got his revenge, he wore war paint in a design similar to a domino mask.

In the futuristic Robin 3000, Earth is controlled by despotic aliens. Batman (Bruce Wayne XX) is killed trying to stop them, but his mission is continued by his nephew, Tom (Thomas) Wayne. This was originally created by P. Craig Russell in 1986 as Tom Swift 3000, but later rewritten in 1992 as a Robin story when the original plans fell through.

In the Robin 1996 Elseworlds annual, an unnamed young warrior in 16th century Japan is raised by the Bat-Samurai, and nicknamed Tengu, after the bird-spirits, by a female Cat-Ninja. Tengu loses his mentor in battle. Tengu was later revealed to be the rightful heir to the imperial throne, and the usurper (believing he knew this and plotted against him) attempted to kill him. He killed the usurper in self-defense but, since he had already sworn loyalty, was constrained to suicide as a result of this dishonor.

In the Detective Comics 1996 Elseworlds annual (Batman: Leatherwing), an orphan on the streets of 17th century Kingston who became cabin boy to Leatherwing the pirate.

In the Robin 1998 Legends of The Dead Earth annual, humanity is trying to reach other worlds in generation ships. On one of these, a group called the Proctors have seized control and everyone else are slaves who are executed on their 30th birthdays to conserve the ship's resources. Tris Plover, a 29-year-old slave, rebels against the Proctors. She meets another rebel, called the Batman, who gives her the Robin identity. At the cost of their lives, they succeed in defeating the Proctors and Robin sets the ship on a course for the planet New Gotham. "Bird Dark" is the name of Batman's partner in the somewhat garbled fables told on another colony world, as featured in the "Legends of the Dead Earth" Batman Annual #20. (1996) While the name is based on Nightwing, the costume is in Robin's colors.

In JLA: The Nail, Dick (as Robin), along with Barbara (as Batgirl) is tortured then murdered by The Joker with his Kryptonian gauntlets, driving Batman temporarily insane after he witnesses their ordeals and death.  The grief-stricken hero then kills Joker for revenge.  Later, in the sequel JLA: Another Nail, Dick returns as a spirit after the Joker returns from Hell.   He helps Batman defeats the Clown Prince of Crime once and for all, and gives Batman the strength to move on.

Tiny Titans
Tiny Titans is a kiddie-based series follows the exploits of the Teen Titans (and other DCU character), as grade school kids attending school for Super-hero sidekicks.  Dick Grayson's Robin is a primary character in the series, and often tries to act like the leader, although the rest of the Tiny Titans rarely listen to him.  He temporarily began wearing a kiddie version of his first Nightwing costume, but later went back to being Robin.  Later issues eventually introduced Jason Todd and Tim Drake into the series as toddlers who Barbara Gordon babysits.  Both Jason and Dick wear the original Robin costumes, while Tim wears the 2006 "One Year Later" Robin costume. Talon also appears as a frequent enemy of Robin, but in the conclusion of issue 46 he gets his hair cut like Robin by Batman's butler.

Batman: Year 100
An alternative version of Robin appears in Paul Pope's Batman: Year 100 limited series. This Robin is a dark-skinned teenager who acts as Batman's partner as well as the mechanic for "the Batmobile", a high-tech motorcycle. Little is revealed about this Robin's backstory other than that he was apparently adopted by Batman at a young age, and that Robin is his real name rather than an alias. Unlike other iterations of the character, the Robin in "Year 100" does not wear a costume.

Pre-Crisis Hypertime
Hypertime is a fictional concept presented in the 1999 DC comic book series The Kingdom, to explain any continuity discrepancies in DC Universe stories and a variations of the Multiverse that existed before Crisis on Infinite Earths. During the "Hypertension" story arc, Superboy Kon-El travels through multiple realities battling Black Zero an evil alternate version of himself that's been abducting other clone Superboys. One of the alternate Superboys has become Batman's latest Robin.

Captain Carrot and His Amazing Zoo Crew
The 1980s series Captain Carrot and His Amazing Zoo Crew presented the parallel Earth of "Earth-C-Minus," a world populated by talking animal superheroes that paralleled the mainstream DC Universe. Earth-C-Minus was the home of Boyd, the Robin Wonder, a robin sidekick to the Batmouse, and presumably an analog of the mainstream DC Universe's Dick Grayson (including wearing a variant of Dick Grayson's Robin costume).

Injustice series

Injustice: Gods Among Us
In the prequel comic of the video game Injustice: Gods Among Us, Damian remains under the guise of Robin until Year Five where he becomes Nightwing. Although he will still become one of Superman's allies in his Regime. It is revealed in Year One that Dick Grayson's death at the hands of Damian Wayne was a mere accident because Damian was frustrated at Dick's lecturing him during a prison riot. In Year Two, Damian makes two minor appearances: once to alert Superman to Sinestro's arrival at the Justice League Watchtower, and again while Despero, having been assaulted by the Sinestro Corps, is crashing toward Earth. In Year Three, Damian attempts to defeat some villains and nearly gets killed but Dick Grayson, (now the new Deadman), saves him and gives him his old Nightwing costume as a birthday present, unaware to Damian or any other Regime members. Despite having severed ties with his father, Damian still greatly regards Alfred. Unknown to Damian, Superman, thinking Damian's “Nightwing” birthday gift is a set up by Batman, secretly sends Zsasz to kill Alfred before Damian arrives back at the Batcave. With Alfred gone, Damian now joins Superman's Regime. Batman, becoming aware of Superman's plan afterward, is too late to convince his son of the truth behind Alfred's death.

Injustice 2
In the prequel comic of the video game sequel Injustice 2, Damian is first seen in a prison cell as  an imprisoned and powerless Superman and Batman talk about what happened, with Batman, tiring of Superman's insistence that it was somehow Bruce's fault for not being there when Clark needed him most, he turns to walk away. As he does so, Superman throws up the past deceased Robins, Dick Grayson and Jason Todd as well as Tim Drake who unbeknownst to Batman is imprisoned in the Phantom Zone along with the surviving Titans.  Then, suddenly, there is an attack on the prison by the Suicide Squad and an imposter Batman, all under the leadership of Damian's mother, Talia and the League of Assassins, to free Damian for his grandfather Ra's Al Ghul's current plans. Damian becomes very angry at his mother and Athanasia Al Ghul for having killed the powerless prison authorities like Turpin, instead of disarming them and not releasing Superman and Cyborg. At Ra's’ secret lair, Damian is introduced to his sister, Athanasia Al Ghul. Later, in Ra's’ Lair, He meets several other of Ra's’ recruits, including, Vixen, Poison Ivy, Cheetah and the impostor Batman's remaining Suicide Squad members. During this meeting, Ra's Al Ghul talks about the 5 years since Joker's corruption of Superman and the state of the world. Damian is later tasked along with Deadshot and Katana to capture the original Blue Beetle, Ted Kord. On the next day, Damian brings Alfred's corpse from Wayne Manor while having Black Lightning's daughters, and the son of Green Arrow and Black Canary be kidnapped, and later to nurse his butler after resurrecting him in the Lazarus Pit. Later during the Insurgency's raid on Ra's hideout in South America, Damian predicts that the Insurgency will come with no surrender thanks to Batman. Damian fought his father temporarily until a fully recovered Alfred stops them from killing each other. As Blue Beetle destroys Ra's hideout, which indirectly kills most of the extinct animals and accidentally kills Diablo, Damian is separated from Alfred. Despite Alfred currently being under the Insurgency's care, Damian is still glad he is safe.

Few days later, Damian was sent to recruit Black Adam. However, the ruler of Kahndaq refuses to cooperate with Ra's. At the same time Damian met Kara Zor-El/Supergirl, who is later revealed to be a Kryptonian like Superman. He and Kara are later fighting terrorists while passing by flying together. As Damian is about kill a terrorist, Kara told him to stop from making a mistake on behalf of her feelings to protect the innocence without killing everyone. On the next day, Adam recommended Damian to stay with him and Kara, while needing his help for their rescue mission on freeing  their ally, Diana. As Kara is sent to infiltrate Amazon, the nations' security is very tight, Damian is worried if the Amazons spill the truth about what the Regimes had done 5 years, the Regime will lose Kara, but Adam tells Damian to be patient, and is soon glad to find out that most of the Amazonian are still loyal to Diana, quickly succeeding the rescue without being captured. Upon hearing news about the massacre in the small town at Williams, Arizona caused by his grandfather and Solovar sending Amazo killing every human around including women and children, Damian departs to Gorilla City where the League of Assassins and their Suicide Squad are hiding to inform his closest allies (Vixen and Animal Man) about what the Gorillas and League of Assassins had done to the peaceful people of the said town, then spills the truth to entire two villainous groups to prevent Kahndaq sharing a similar fate, resulting in Gorilla Grodd's failed uprising attempt from taking over Gorilla City, leading him and his followers to be exiled from their home city. He, Animal Man and Vixen soon warn their Regime allies about Ra's and Solovar's plan to bring destructions on innocent humans, while Kara herself is not yet prepared to fight against Amazo and must stay in Kahndaq.

The third Robin, Tim Drake/Red Robin, one of the Titans who first rebelled Superman's regime is being released from the Phantom Zone's imprisonment along with Wonder Girl and Starfire, with the exception of Superboy who preferred to stay in the said dimension after Superman broke his heart back in the first game's previous comic issue. Unfortunately, Tim's reunion did not last long, as Zod trails the Titans to be able to escape and shots Tim's heart with his Heat Vision from behind, killing the Boy Wonder. Before Batman plans to avenge Tim's death, Ra's sends Amazo to kill Zod for good, and Harley sadly expresses about how Tim had been a better Robin as Dick used to be if they were alive. After fully he recovered from his heart surgery during Amazo's attack, Superboy, now the Insurgency's new Superman learned that he is now implanted with Zod's heart, the same villainous Kryptonian general who murdered Tim.

At some point after Damian was forced to return to League of Assassins by his mother and younger sister, Damian figured out that the impostor Batman is none other than the revived former second Robin, Jason Todd, now working for Ra's. During the Insurgency's raid on the Assassins' hideout in South America to save one of their kidnapped children and Harley, Jason fought Wildcat and almost killed him, until Green Arrow and Black Canary's son Conner knocks Jason back with a sonic scream inherited from his mother Canary. As the League of Assassins and their Suicide Squads relocated in Gorilla City to allied themselves with King Solovar, then recently kill the peaceful human civilians in Arizona by dispatching Amazo, Jason starting to doubt about Ra's ideal.

By time Ra's and Solovar begin their plans to wipe out every humans on Earth after Grodd and his followers had been exiled, Damian, Vixen, and Animal Man plan a second rebellion against Ra's for his madness. Jason soon figures out the three heroes' plan to betray Ra's. However, Damian tries to convince Jason of what they are doing for Ra's is actually wrong, and believes in him that killing innocent human civilians is not what he desired.

Injustice vs. The Masters of the Universe
As this series continues alternatively from the second game's bad ending, it revealed that Damian (now as a new Batman) and his fellow ex-Regime and Titans member Cyborg finally realize what they have been fighting for, just like how The Flash, Hal Jordan and the late-Shazam felt before them, and began to defect to and lead the Insurgency, while also being joined by the former Batman imposter Jason/Red Hood. Damian admit on never forget his accidental sin he committed on his late-Nightwing predecessor Dick.

When Skeletor's Army arrived in their universe's Earth, at the same time Darkseid's Apokalips Army arrived there as well, Damian summoned He-Man/Prince Adam and his allies for a same purposes. After manage to find and freed his both father and predecessor from Superman's Brainiac Tech brainwashing, Damian told him about Supergirl's location and compare Superman to be just like Zod and Ra's was. Unfortunately, Damian is snapped by Wonder Woman's lasso on his neck from behind in cold blood, but his death eventually gives original Batman a stronger will to break free from Superman's control. When Skeletor revealed his true color on playing both Darkseid and Superman's side for his scheme, Superman stand down and recently mourn Damian's death, leading him once again made a temporary truce to settle with Darkseid and Skeletor.

References

Batman lists
Batman characters
Robin (character)
Fictional characters from parallel universes
Robin